The Thompson Mortuary Chapel, now Demaray's Gooding Chapel, is a historic building in Gooding, Idaho, designed by Tourtellotte & Hummel.  It was placed on the National Register of Historic Places in 1982.

In was built in 1939 for A. E. Thompson of Gooding as a home for his furniture and undertaking business.  It is a rare example of the art moderne style in Idaho.

References

Properties of religious function on the National Register of Historic Places in Idaho
Streamline Moderne architecture in the United States
Buildings and structures completed in 1939
Buildings and structures in Gooding County, Idaho
National Register of Historic Places in Gooding County, Idaho